Pomaderris ligustrina, commonly known as privet pomaderris, is a species of flowering plant in the family Rhamnaceae and is endemic to south-eastern continental Australia. It is a shrub with hairy stems, lance-shaped to narrowly elliptic leaves, and loose clusters of cream-coloured or yellow flowers.

Description
The upper surface of the leaves is glabrous and the lower surface covered with silky, rust-coloured hairs. Flowering occurs in September and October.

Taxonomy
Pomaderris ligustrina was first formally described in 1825 by Augustin Pyramus de Candolle in Prodromus Systematis Naturalis Regni Vegetabilis from an unpublished description by Franz Sieber. The specific epithet (ligustrina) means "privet-like".

In 1997, Neville Grant Walsh and Fiona Coates described subspecies latifolia in the journal Muelleria and the name, and that of the autonym are accepted by the Australian Plant Census:

Distribution and habitat
Subspecies latifolia is rare and only occurs in south-eastern Queensland and as far south as Guyra in northern New South Wales.

References

Flora of New South Wales
ligustrina
Flora of Victoria (Australia)
Flora of Queensland
Plants described in 1825
Taxa named by Augustin Pyramus de Candolle